Alive Festival, located in Mineral City, Ohio, is an annual Christian music festival. It features many Christian musicians and popular Christian bands, as well as several Christian speakers and worship leaders. The festival began in 1988 and celebrated its 20th anniversary June 20–23, 2007.

Alive is usually held in mid-summer over four days. Attendants can stay overnight at Atwood Lake Park in Mineral City, Ohio. Atwood lake Park features camping, swimming, a  lake, boating, electric hook-ups, hiking trails, volleyball, basketball,
Alive Festival is a member of the Christian Festival Association, created in 2006.
According to Bill and Kathy Graening, heads of the Alive Festival Staff, the festival's mission includes: "the opportunity to experience great music and teaching", as well as "the opportunity to be challenged to seek a deeper walk with Christ." It is named after the Christian belief that Jesus Christ is risen and alive.

This festival went on hiatus in 2020.

Past and upcoming Alive artists 
The following artists have appeared in the past or are scheduled to appear at upcoming Alive Festivals:

Performers

#
12 Stones
121
33Miles
4th Avenue Jones

A
As We Ascend
A Minor Bird
Aaron Shust
According 2 John
Ace Troubleshooter
Across the Sky
All Star United
All Together Separate
Anberlin
Andrew Peterson (musician)
Andy Mineo
Anthem Lights
ApologetiX
As I Lay Dying
Ashley Cleveland
Audio Adrenaline
Austrian Death Machine

B
BarlowGirl
Beanbag
Bebo Norman
Benjamin Payne
Bethany Dillon
Betsy Walker
Beyond The Rage
Big Daddy Weave
Big Tent Revival
Blame Lucy
Blindside
Bleach
Bluetree
Bradley Hathaway
Brandon Heath
Brian Littrell
Britt Nicole
Brooke Barrettsmith
Brother's Keeper
Byron "Talkbox" Chambers
Building 429
Burlap to Cashmere

C
Capital Kings
Casting Crowns
Chris Rice
Chris Tomlin
Christafari
Christine Glass
Circadian rhythm
Clear
Colton Dixon
Common Children
Copeland
Curious Fools

D
David Crowder Band
Day of Fire
Day Method
dc Talk
Decyfer Down
Delirious?
Denver and the Mile High Orchestra
DJ Maj
The Devil Wears Prada
Disciple
Disciples of Christ
Divine Soldiers
Dogwood
Downhere

E
Earthsuit
Eleventyseven
Emery
Erin O'Donnell
Esterlyn
Everfound
Everyday Sunday

F
Family Force 5
Falling Up
FFH
Fighting Instinct
Fireflight
Five Iron Frenzy
Flight 180
Flyleaf
FM Static
For King & Country (band)
For Today
Francesca Battistelli

G
Ginny Owens
Grits
Group 1 Crew
Guardian

H
Haste the Day
Hawk Nelson
High Flight Society
Hillsong United
Hillsong Young & Free
Honeytree
House of Heroes
Hyper Static Union

I
Imperials
Icon for Hire
Inhabited
Inhale Exhale

J
Jaci Velasquez
Jackson Waters
Jake
Jared Anderson
Jason Bonham
Jeff Anderson
Jennifer Knapp
Jeremy Camp
Jerome Olds & The Brothers aka Family Force 5
Jesse's Vineyard
Jimmy Needham
John Mark McMillan
John Reuben
Jonah33
Jonny Diaz
Jon McLaughlin
Josh Wilson
Joy Williams
Joy Whitlock
Justifide
Justin McRoberts

K
Kari Jobe
KB
Kendall Payne
Kerrie Roberts
Kevin Max
Kids in the Way
Kirk Franklin
KJ-52
Kutless
Kris Allen
Krystal Meyers

L
LA Symphony
Lacey Sturm
LaRue
Last Tuesday
Lecrae
Leeland
Lincoln Brewster
Lindsey Kane
Lloyd
Lost and Found

M
M.O.C.
Mainstay
Manafest
Manic Drive
Mark Schultz
Mars Ill
Mat Kearney
Mat Redman
Matthew West
Memphis May Fire
MercyMe
Mile 7
Miss Angie
Mixtape Metro
Monk & Neagle
Mutemath
My Friend Stephanie

N
Nate Sallie
Needtobreathe
Newsboys
NF (rapper)
Nikki Leonti
Nitengale
Norma Jean
Our Heart's Hero
Out of Eden

O

P
Palisade
Parachute Band
Paul Clark
Paul Colman Trio
Paul Baloche
Paul Wright
PAX217
Petra
PFR
Phil Keaggy
Phil Wickham
Pillar
Plankeye
Playdough
Plus One (band)
Pocket Full of Rocks
Point of Grace
Polarboy
Praise-apella
Project 86

Q

R
Rachel Lampa
Randy Stonehill
Reality Check
Remedy Drive
Rebecca St. James
Red
Reilly
Relient K
Rich Mullins
Riley Armstrong
Roper
Ruth
Ryan Wilkins

S
Salvador
Sanctus Real
Sarah Kelley
Satellite Soul
Satellites & Sirens
Scarecrow & Tinman
Seabird
Seven Places
Seventh Day Slumber
Shaded Red
Shane & Shane
Shine Bright Baby
Shonlock
Shuree
Silers Bald
Sixpence None the Richer
Skillet
Sleeping Giant (band)
Smalltown Poets
Social Club
Speck
Spoken
Starfield
Stavesacre
Stellar Kart
Steven Curtis Chapman
Steve Camp
Stacie Orrico
Staple
Subseven
Sunny With A High (formerly Mixtape Metro)
Superchick
Switchfoot

T
Tait
Telecast
Temple Yard
Ten Shekel Shirt
Tenth Avenue North
Thalon
Third Day
The Afters
The Benjamin Gate
The Channelsurfers
The Classic Crime
The Devil Wears Prada
The Elms
The Evan Anthem
The Fold
The Insyderz
The Katinas
The Normals
The O.C. Supertones
The Swift
The W's
The Wedding
Thousand Foot Krutch
This Beautiful Republic
TobyMac
Tree 63
Trevor Morgan
Twila Paris

U

V
Verbs
Vicky Beeching

W
War of Ages
Warren Barfield
Wavorly
We Are Messengers
We As Human
Willet
Worth Dying For
Wolves at the Gate
White Heart

X

Y

Z
ZOEgirl

Past and upcoming speakers 

Kirk Cameron
Reggie Dabbs
Louie Giglio
Ben Homan, President of Food for the Hungry
Tim Hughes, UK-based worship leader
Phil Keaggy
Crystal Miller, survivor of Columbine massacre and popular speaker on the meaning of life
David Nasser, minister and director of D. Nasser Outreach
Tony Nolan, TNT Ministries
Mark Price, Point Guard for the Cleveland Cavaliers
Brady Quinn, quarterback of the Cleveland Browns
Joe Savage, pastor and organizer of Winners Influence
Phil Savage, General Manager of Cleveland Browns
Hunter Smith, Indianapolis Colts punter
Scott Spencer, founder of Character Corporation
Brad Stine, comedian
Jason Wright, American businessman and football executive

References 

Christian music festivals
Music festivals in Ohio